Southwest Guilford High School is a secondary school in High Point, North Carolina, United States established in 1979.  It serves grades nine through twelve. The school was recently renovated and expanded to add more class rooms, a media center, and a gymnasium. The new gymnasium is the largest high school gym in Guilford County. The gym is named after long time SW Guilford teacher and coach Jim Coggins.

Athletics

The Southwest Guilford Athletic program is led by athletic director Brindon Christman. The SW teams are known as the "Cowboys and Cowgirls." The school colors are kelly green, black and white. However, when the school was first started the colors were brown, kelly green, and white.

Southwest has rivalries with the Ragsdale High School Tigers, as well as crosstown schools T. Wingate Andrews High School and High Point Central High School.

Southwest has claimed state championships in nine different sports. The four latest are Volleyball in 2006, Men's Indoor Track in 2009,  Women's Basketball in 2011, and Men's Basketball in 2017.

Southwest has enjoyed success of late in Men's Basketball, Women's Basketball, Men's and Women's Tennis, Baseball, and Men's and Women's Soccer winning numerous conference championships.  The Women's Basketball team won the Piedmont Triad 3-A Conference Championship in 2007–2008 under Head Coach Duane Willis. It was the school's first women's basketball conference championship in 11 years. In the 2009–2010 season the Cowgirls went to a 20–6 final record winning the Piedmont Triad 4-A Conference Championship as well as the Conference Tournament Title. Women's basketball followed that season up with 4-A State Championship in 2011. The team's final record was 30–2.

The Men's Indoor Track team claimed the 1-A/2-A/3-A State Championship in 2009.

Notable outstanding athletes from SW are Olympic and professional soccer player Eddie Pope, MLS standout Clyde Simms (currently with the D.C. United), NFL Defensive Back Brian Williams, and NFL player Stefon Adams.

State championships
 Women's Basketball 1984, 1985, 2011, 2017
 Women's Volleyball 1995, 2006
 Men's Volleyball 2004
 Men's Indoor Track 2009,1995
 Men's Basketball 1996, 2017, 2019
 Men's Soccer 1994
 Men's Golf 1987, 2004
 Baseball 1997
 Women's Swimming 1997
 Women's Soccer 1997, 2001, 2002

Notable alumni
 Stefon Adams, NFL defensive back
 Brandon Banks, NFL defensive end
 Adam Lazzara, vocalist of Taking Back Sunday
 Raj Panjabi, physician, social entrepreneur and professor
 Cheyenne Parker, professional basketball player in the WNBA
 Eddie Pope, former MLS player and United States men's national soccer team (USMNT) member
 Clyde Simms, former MLS player and USMNT member
 Brian Williams, NFL defensive back

See also 
 List of high schools in North Carolina

References 

Educational institutions established in 1979
Public high schools in North Carolina
Schools in Guilford County, North Carolina
Buildings and structures in High Point, North Carolina
1979 establishments in North Carolina